Malekabad (also Romanized as Abbas ābād and Deh Abbas) is a village in Abbas abad Rural District, in the Central District of Eslamshahr County, Tehran Province, Iran. At the 2016 census, its population was 1635, in 502 families.

References 

Populated places in Eslamshahr County